The Radioactive Isotope Beam Factory is a multistage particle accelerator complex operated by Japan's Nishina Center for Accelerator-Based Science which is itself a part of the Institute of Physical and Chemical Research. Located in Saitama, the RIBF generates unstable nuclei of all elements up to uranium and studies their properties. According to physicist Robert Janssens, "[it] can produce the most intense beams of primary particles in the world."

RIBF took ten years to construct and its Superconducting Ring Cyclotron (SRC) can achieve energies of 2,600 MeV.

Work at the RIBF has contributed to the understanding of atomic magic numbers.

References

External links
 RIBF Main Page

Research institutes in Japan
Nuclear research institutes